Bibern was a municipality in the canton of Schaffhausen in Switzerland. On 1 January 2009 Bibern merged with Altdorf, Hofen, Opfertshofen and Thayngen to form the municipality of Thayngen.

References

External links

 

Former municipalities of the canton of Schaffhausen
Former municipalities of Switzerland